True Stories is the seventh studio album by American rock band Talking Heads. It was released on September 15, 1986, by Sire Records, preceding lead singer David Byrne's related film True Stories.

The album includes only Talking Heads studio recordings of songs from the film; an original cast recording from the film was planned, but was not released at the time, although some actors' performances were featured on singles of songs drawn from the album. Later that year, Byrne released the album Sounds from True Stories containing incidental music from the soundtrack. In 2018, a complete film soundtrack album was finally released, combining cast performances from the film and tracks from the two previous albums; only those three performances by Talking Heads from the first True Stories album that are actually heard in the film were included.

The single "Wild Wild Life" became the most prominent hit from the album, accompanied by its video airplay on MTV. The "Wild Wild Life" video won two MTV Video Music Awards in 1987: "Best Group Video" and "Best Video from a Film" (the video is in fact an extended sequence lifted directly from the film itself). A video for "Love for Sale" was created for use in the film (during a sequence when a woman, played by Swoosie Kurtz, watches the video on TV), and an extended version was later released as a video in its own right.

In 2006, the album was re-released and remastered by Warner Music Group on their Warner Bros./Sire Records/Rhino Records labels in DualDisc format, with three bonus tracks on the CD side (an extended mix of "Wild Wild Life", "Papa Legba" with vocal by Pops Staples, and "Radio Head" with vocals by Tito Larriva). The DVD-Audio side includes both stereo and 5.1 surround high resolution (96 kHz/24bit) mixes, as well as a Dolby Digital version and the videos of "Wild Wild Life" and "Love for Sale". In Europe, it was released as a CD+DVDA two disc set rather than a single DualDisc. The reissue was produced by Andy Zax with Talking Heads.

Reception

From contemporary reviews, Ken Tucker of The Philadelphia Inquirer gave the album a three out of four stars rating, stating the album was "gently melodic pop, with little of the polyrhythmic aggressiveness that has characterized recent Talking Heads albums." Tucker found that "some of the songs verge on triteness or banality" but "Love for Sale" and "People Like Us" were "beautiful rock music."

Track listing

Tracks 11 and 12 appear on the 2006 CD issue only. Of the 9 tracks on the original LP release, "Love for Sale", "Wild Wild Life" and "City of Dreams" are the only recordings that actually appear in the film. On screen, the other songs are performed by the film actors; two of those are included among the bonus tracks of the 2006 reissue. The performance of "Papa Legba" by Pops Staples that was included in 2006 reissue runs a full minute longer than the track included in the "complete soundtrack" version of 2018.

The band Radiohead named themselves after track six, "Radio Head".

Personnel

Talking Heads
David Byrne – guitar, vocals
Chris Frantz – drums
Jerry Harrison – keyboards, guitar, backing vocals
Tina Weymouth – bass guitar, backing vocals

Additional musicians
Bert Cross Choir – vocals on "Puzzlin' Evidence"
Tommy Camfield – fiddle on "People Like Us"
Paulinho da Costa – percussion on "Papa Legba", "Radio Head", and "People Like Us"
Steve Jordan – accordion on "Radio Head"
St. Thomas Aquinas Elementary  School Choir – vocals on "Hey Now"
Tommy Morrell – pedal steel guitar on "People Like Us" and "City of Dreams"

Production
Charles Brocco – mixing assistance
Paul Christiensen – overdubbing engineering on "Puzzlin' Evidence"
Nick del Ray – engineering assistance
Mick Guzauski – mixing on "Wild Wild Life"
Lee Herschburg – mixing on "People Like Us"
Robin Laine – mixing assistance
Michael McClain – overdubbing engineering on "Hey Now", "Radio Head", "People Like Us", and "City of Dreams"
Tom Nist – mixing assistance
Jack Skinner – mastering
Eric Thorngren – engineering, mixing, overdubbing
Melanie West – engineering assistance

Charts

Weekly charts

Year-end charts

Certifications

References

Bibliography

 

1986 albums
Albums produced by David Byrne
Albums produced by Chris Frantz
Albums produced by Jerry Harrison
Albums produced by Tina Weymouth
Albums recorded at Sigma Sound Studios
Concept albums
Sire Records albums
Talking Heads albums